"Get Over It" is the debut single by American rock band OK Go, from their self-titled debut album (2002). It was released as a promotional single in the US (the band's first Capitol Records release) in 2002 and was released in the UK in March 2003 which got the band their first Top of the Pops performance on April 4, 2003.

"You're So Damn Hot" appeared on the band's first album. The B-side "Antmusic" (originally performed by Adam and the Ants from the 1980 album Kings of the Wild Frontier) was previously released on the band's Pink EP in 2000 while "Bruise Grey" is a remake of one of the band's earlier songs which had appeared on their demo disc.

This song was also part of the Madden NFL 2003 and Triple Play 2002 soundtracks. It was also a DLC song for Guitar Hero 5.

Music video
A music video was made in 2002. It features the band performing the song in a large recreation hall. Various objects are also shown from time to time such as garbage bags, a wedge of cheese, deer heads, furniture, a Cadillac and different murals. The song is stopped in the middle to show a shot of the band playing ping-pong. The video was directed by Francis Lawrence and was released through the band's website on August 1, 2002. It first aired on MTV on September 2, 2002. The video was created by the same team that did the video for Maroon 5's Harder To Breathe.

Track listing

US promo CD single
 "Get Over It" – 3:18
 "You're So Damn Hot"

UK CD single
 "Get Over It" – 3:18
 "Ant Music" – 2:53
 "Bruise Grey"
 "Get Over It" NHnced Video"

UK 7" single
 "Get Over It" – 3:18
 "Ant Music" – 2:53

Australian CD single
 "Get Over It" – 3:18
 "Ant Music – 2:53
 "Aren't We Dozy?" – 2:43
 "It's Tough to Have a Crush When the Boy Doesn't Feel the Same Way You Do" – 2:07

Charts

References

2002 debut singles
OK Go songs
Music videos directed by Francis Lawrence
Songs written by Damian Kulash
2002 songs
Capitol Records singles